Darrell Hill may refer to:

 Darrell Hill (American football) (born 1979), American football wide receiver
 Darrell Hill (shot putter) (born 1993), American track and field shot putter